Frank Hammond Suffel (July 5, 1866  – March 15, 1937) was a Canadian-born lawyer, college Latin instructor, and American football coach. Born in Vienna, Ontario, he worked as a Latin instructor at the University of Southern California (USC) during the 1888–89 academic year. Suffel served as the co-head football coach with Henry H. Goddard at USC in 1888, compiling a record of 2–0. He died in Los Angeles, California on March 15, 1937.

Head coaching record

References

1866 births
1937 deaths
USC Trojans football coaches
University of Toronto alumni
People from Elgin County
Sportspeople from Ontario